The End is a 1978 American black comedy film directed by and starring Burt Reynolds, written by Jerry Belson, and with music composed by Paul Williams. The film also stars Dom DeLuise along with Sally Field, Strother Martin, David Steinberg, Joanne Woodward, Norman Fell, Myrna Loy, Kristy McNichol, Pat O'Brien, Robby Benson and Carl Reiner.

Reynolds later said he "loved" the film. "Nobody wanted to do it. They allowed me to do The End if I did Hooper, which made a fortune for Warner Brothers. But The End eventually made $40 million."

Plot
Wendell "Sonny" Lawson, an unscrupulous real-estate promoter, learns that he has a fatal blood disease and decides to kill himself rather than enduring a slow, painful death. He takes the time to meet with several friends and family members for the last time, while hiding the fact about his suicide attempt. Sonny ends up in a mental institution, where he befriends a fellow patient, Marlon Borunki, a deranged schizophrenic murderer.

Cast

Burt Reynolds as Wendell Sonny Lawson 
Dom DeLuise as Marlon Borunki 
Sally Field as Mary Ellen 
Strother Martin as Dr. Waldo Kling 
David Steinberg as Marty Lieberman 
Joanne Woodward as Jessica Lawson 
Norman Fell as Dr. Samuel Krugman 
Myrna Loy as Maureen Lawson 
Kristy McNichol as Julie Lawson 
Pat O'Brien as Ben Lawson 
Robby Benson as Father Dave Benson 
Carl Reiner as Dr. James Maneet 
Louise LeTourneau as Receptionist 
Bill Ewing as Hearse Driver 
Robert Rothwell as Limousine Driver
James Best as Pacemaker Patient
Frank McRae as Male Nurse
Jock Mahoney as Old Man

Production
Belson wrote the script in 1971 and it was under development at Columbia Pictures before producer Lawrence Gordon took it on. He sat on the script for five years until Burt Reynolds became attached and the film went into development at United Artists. Reynolds said he wanted to do the film because "I'd read an awful lot of comedies and none struck me as especially funny, according to my strange sense of comedy. There are a lot of minefields in this topic, death, and that's why everybody turned it down over the last five years."

He elaborated: "You can deal with death on a totally Mel Brooks level, but when you try to make a film with parts that are really real amidst the comedy, that's a big risk. What's really funny is what's real. When I was very sick, if I told you what I did, it was funny."

The studio was reluctant to finance The End. They were unhappy with Reynolds wearing a beard and wanted his profession to be a stock car racer. But Reynolds insisted.

Reynolds said "Some people think the guy in The End is as far away from me as anybody could be, but people who really know me realize that it's very close to what I am. The guy crying in the doctor's office, that's me. This guy is totally nude."
 
The original ending had Marlon kill Sonny. Reynolds said he changed it "because I thought it had to have some hope."

Reynolds said, "If I do anything similar to other directors, it's very much like European directors in the sense that in The End I crowd the actors with the camera. I do that because he's suffocating, so I used an inordinate number of close-ups, using close-ups the way others would use masters. Wertmüller did it a lot in Seven Beauties. Mr. Klein had a lot of tight close-ups."

Songs
 "Another Fine Mess"
 Music and lyrics by Paul Williams
 Sung by Glen Campbell

Release and reception
The End had its world premiere as the closing night film at Filmex in Los Angeles on May 7, 1978, and was released in New York City and Los Angeles on May 10.

The mixture of comedy with the dark subject of suicide was not what critics were expecting from a Burt Reynolds film, and was not well-received. New York Times critic Vincent Canby gave the film a negative review, placing most of the blame on the shoulders of Burt Reynolds, the director. He felt the film was uneven, writing, "this is half-heartedly satiric material that's been directed by Mr. Reynolds as if it were broad, knock-about comedy sometimes and, at other times, as if it were meant to evoke pathos, which it never does."  Art Murphy at Variety magazine was even more critical of the film, calling it "a tasteless and overripe comedy that disintegrates very early into hysterical, undisciplined hamming." The magazine's terse review was particularly harsh when it came to the supporting cast, calling Dom DeLuise "absolutely dreadful," Sally Field "phoning in a kooky-pretty role," and Joanne Woodward, "poorly utilized."

As of April 2020, The End held a 60% rating on Rotten Tomatoes based on fifteen reviews.

It was, however, well enough received by audiences and was a moderate box office success. After 2 weeks in New York and L.A., it expanded to 466 theaters in the U.S. and Canada and grossed $4,571,980 in its first 6 days of nationwide release and went on to make nearly $45,000,000 in the U.S. and Canada alone.

References

External links

 

 
 

1978 films
1970s black comedy films
1970s buddy comedy-drama films
American black comedy films
American buddy comedy-drama films
1970s English-language films
Films about suicide
Films directed by Burt Reynolds
Films set in California
United Artists films
Films with screenplays by Jerry Belson
1978 comedy films
1970s American films